Alex Young (born 6 April 1999) is a Jamaica international rugby league footballer who plays as a er for Newcastle Thunder in Betfred Championship.

Background
Young was born in Dewsbury, West Yorkshire, England. He is of Jamaican descent.

His brother is England international Dom Young.

Playing career

Club career
Young played in 24 games and scored 1 try for Workington Town in the 2022 RFL Championship.

International career
In 2022 Young was named in the Jamaica squad for the 2021 Rugby League World Cup. He made his debut on the wing in the Group C match against Ireland at Headingley Rugby Stadium in Leeds, West Yorkshire.

References

External links
Workington Town profile
Jamaica profile

1999 births
Living people
English rugby league players
English people of Jamaican descent
Jamaica national rugby league team players
Newcastle Thunder players
Rugby league players from Dewsbury
Rugby league wingers
Workington Town players